Paolino Dimai (28 January 1931 – 5 February 2011) was an Italian speed skater. He competed in the men's 5000 metres event at the 1956 Winter Olympics.

References

External links
 

1931 births
2011 deaths
Italian male speed skaters
Olympic speed skaters of Italy
Speed skaters at the 1956 Winter Olympics
People from Cortina d'Ampezzo
Sportspeople from the Province of Belluno